The Trident was a  74-gun ship of the line of the French Navy.

On 13 February 1814, she was part of Julien Cosmao's squadron which was intercepted off Toulon by a British blockade. The , at the rear, managed to hold off the British ships long enough for the rest of the squadron to escape.

In 1827, at the Battle of Navarino, she silenced coastal defences with the Sirène.

She took part in the Invasion of Algiers in 1830. In 1831, the served as flagship of the Toulon squadron under Rear-admiral Baron Hugon, and took part in the Battle of the Tagus under Captain Casy, reaching Lisbon.

In 1854, she took part in the Crimean War, and was used as a troop ship the next year in the Black Sea.

She was struck on 24 November 1857 and was used as a barracks hulk from 1857 to 1869.

She was eventually broken up in 1874-5.

References

External links 
 Ships of the line

Ships of the line of the French Navy
Téméraire-class ships of the line
1811 ships
Crimean War naval ships of France